Oak Grove is a historic plantation house located near Eastville, Northampton County, Virginia. The original section of the manor house was built about 1750, and is a -story, gambrel-roofed colonial-period structure.  It has a two-story Federal style wing added about 1811, and a two-story Greek Revival style wing added about 1840. The house was remodeled and enlarged in the 1940s. Also on the property are the contributing five early outbuildings, three 20th century farm buildings, and a well tended formal garden designed by the Richmond landscape architect Charles Gillette.

It was listed on the National Register of Historic Places in 1993.

References

Plantation houses in Virginia
Houses on the National Register of Historic Places in Virginia
Federal architecture in Virginia
Greek Revival houses in Virginia
Houses completed in 1750
Houses in Northampton County, Virginia
National Register of Historic Places in Northampton County, Virginia
1750 establishments in Virginia